Norm Katnik (born July 2, 1981) is a former American football center who played one season in the National Football League. He was originally signed by the San Francisco 49ers as an undrafted free agent in 2004. He played college football at Southern California.

Katnik has also been a member of the New York Jets, Minnesota Vikings, Denver Broncos and most recently in camp with the Baltimore Ravens.

Early years
Katnik prepped at Foothill High in Santa Ana, California.  He started on both the offensive and defensive lines.

College career
Katnik played college football at the University of Southern California.  He was 1 of 6 finalists for the 2003 Dave Rimington Trophy, third-team All-America and first-team All-Pac-10 Conference.

Professional career
He was originally signed by the San Francisco 49ers but saw no action in a regular season game. He also spent time with the New York Jets, and started two games during the 2006 season. He was signed to the Vikings practice squad near the end of the 2006 NFL season and was on the practice squad for the remainder of that year.

External links
Denver Broncos bio
New York Jets bio
USC Trojans bio

1981 births
Living people
Players of American football from Tucson, Arizona
American football centers
American football offensive guards
USC Trojans football players
New York Jets players